John Briggs (born 1945) is an American author and co-author of general audience nonfiction books in the fields of holistic physics; aesthetics in the arts; creativity, creative process, and consciousness studies. Emeritus Distinguished CSU Professor of Writing and Aesthetics at Western Connecticut State University, Briggs lives in Granville, Massachusetts, where he has served as a Selectman and a police officer.

Themes

Holistic approaches to nature, art and indigenous traditions, and reflections on the ways that human consciousness experiences the whole. His early work explored metaphor as a holistic deep structure principle in the arts. More recently, he has linked this metaphor principle to the holistic (holomorphic) mode of consciousness utilized by Native American and other Indigenous cultures. He has advanced the theory that a primal form of ambivalence fulminates at the core of consciousness: the irresolvable paradox between our existence as separate individuals and our existence as inseparable from the whole. His work includes critiques of reductionist assumptions in science, in arts theory, and in anthropocentric thinking generally.

Education and career

Briggs, son of psychiatrist John Briggs, Sr. and psychologist-musician Muriel Ann Briggs, received his B.A. in 1968 from The College of Letters, Wesleyan University, Honors and cum laude; his M.A. in 1972 in literature from New York University, and his Ph.D. in 1981 in aesthetics and psychology from The Union Institute and University.  He taught on the Humanities Faculty at the New School for Social Research from 1973–1984, and was an adjunct professor of English at Brooklyn College (1974) and Mercy College (1974–1987). Since 2003 he has been an on-line scholar in residence at The Institute for Educational Studies, Endicott College Master of Education Program in Integrative Learning (Montessori).

Briggs spent 25 years as a faculty member at Western Connecticut State University (WestConn), beginning in 1987 as the Journalism Coordinator for the English Department. He became full professor in 1995, and in 2000 was chosen as one of 12 CSU Distinguished Professors of the four-campus Connecticut State University system.  At WestConn he served as English Department co-chair in 2003–2007, was a principal designer of both the Master of Fine Arts program in Creative and Professional Writing and the Department of Writing, Linguistics, and Creative Process, which was split off from the English Department in 2007. From 2004–2008 he served as the senior editor for the national literary magazine, Connecticut Review. Teaching literature, his specialties were the modernist novels of writers such as Virginia Woolf, William Faulkner, Franz Kafka, Jorge Luis Borges, and Joseph Conrad. In the writing department, he taught aesthetics and creative process. Shortly before retiring from teaching in 2012, Briggs helped to found the Center for Compassion, Creativity and Innovation at WestConn.

Briggs is a former fellow at The Black Earth Institute, a member of the Society for Consciousness Studies, and of the Contemplative Alliance, an offshoot of the Global Peace Initiative of Women.

Briggs began his professional career as a writer after three years of high school, working as a news reporter for The Tarrytown Daily News, and later the Hartford Courant, as a police reporter during the 1967 riots in Hartford. In 1972 he co-authored the textbook, The Logic of Poetry, published by McGraw-Hill.

Briggs spent the 1970s and 1980s in the orbit of David Shainberg, psychiatrist and painter, the Indian philosopher Jiddu Krishnamurti, and physicist David Bohm. Briggs’ first popular science book, Looking Glass Universe (Simon & Schuster, 1986) was co-authored with F. David Peat, Bohm’s later biographer. During the period from 1972–1977, Briggs was the managing editor of New York Quarterly and co-host of the weekly WNYC-FM radio program "The Logic of Poetry."

Briggs is a fine art photographer—a student of Paul Caponigro—and a published fiction writer and poet.  He is the current publisher of Between Lines Books & Arts.

Books

 Curtains, Windows on the Unreality We Live In. Photographs. Between Lines Books & Arts, 2015.
 Compassion and Creativity: How They Go Together. Editor. Karuna Publications, 2012.
 Trickster Tales: Unrealist Fictions. Between Lines Books & Arts, 2015. Originally published by Fine Tooth Press in 2005.
 Entangled Landscapes: Stories and Poems About the Mind in Nature. With poet James R. Scrimgeour. Pudding House, 2003.
 Seven Life Lessons of Chaos: Spiritual Wisdom From the Science of Change. With F. David Peat. HarperCollins, 1999. German, Chinese, Japanese, Greek, Portuguese, Spanish editions.
 Fractals: The Patterns of Chaos. A new aesthetic of art, science and nature. Simon & Schuster, Touchstone, 1992. Selected, Quality Paperback Book Club, McGraw-Hill Book Club. German, Italian and UK editions.
 Metaphor, the Logic of Poetry. With Richard Monaco. Pace Univ. Press, 1991. Originally The Logic of Poetry, published by McGraw-Hill as a textbook in 1974.
 Turbulent Mirror: An Illustrated Guide to Chaos Theory and the Science of Wholeness. With F. David Peat. Harper & Row, 1989. French, German, Korean, Japanese, Italian, Greek, Chinese (separate mainland and Taiwanese translations), and UK editions; Book of the Month Club, Macmillan Book Club and Quality Paperback Book Club selection.
 Fire in the Crucible: The Alchemy of Creative Genius. St. Martin's Press, 1988.
 Looking Glass Universe. With F. David Peat. Simon and Schuster, 1984. Science Book Club selection. French, Japanese, Italian, UK and Spanish Editions.

Selected chapters in books

 You Have Time for This. "Centerfold" Anthology of Flash Fiction. Mark Budman and Tom Hazuka, Ed. Ooligan Press, 2007. Reprinted in Best American Flash Fiction of the 21st Century. Shanghai Foreign Language Education Press, 2007.
 Dimensions of Conscious Experience. "Where’s The Poetry? Consciousness as the Flight of Three Blackbirds." Paavo Pylkkanen and Tere Vadén, eds. Vol. 37 of the series Advances in Consciousness Research, Amsterdam: John Benjamins Publishing, 2001.
 Lewis Carroll's Lost Quantum Diaries. "Alice in the Mirror of Art." William Shanley, ed. Werner Locher, 1998.
 Voices on the Threshold of Tomorrow. "The Balm of Irony." Quest Books, 1993.
 Virginia Woolf Miscellanies: Proceedings of the First Annual Conference on Virginia Woolf. "Nuance, Metaphor and the Rhythm of the Mood Wave in Virginia Woolf." Pace University Press, 1992.
 The Search for Meaning: The New Spirit in Science and Philosophy. "Ultimate Questioners: The Search for 'Omnivalent' Meaning" Paavo Pylkkanen, ed. Thorsens,1989.
 Quantum Implications. "Reflectaphors: the (Implicate) Universe as a Work of Art." Basil Hiley and F. David Peat, eds. Routledge & Kegan Paul, 1987.
 The Variety of Dream Experience.' "This*Other-ness and Dreams." Montague Ullman and Claire Limmer, eds. Continuum, 1987.
 The Craft of Poetry. Interviews with Richard Wilbur and W.D. Snodgrass. Doubleday, 1974.
 New American Poetry. Six poems. Richard Monaco, ed. McGraw Hill, 1972.

Selected journal and magazine publications

 "Re-embodying Human Consciousness in the Earth." Consciousness: Ideas and Research for the Twenty-First Century. Spring 2016. Vol. 1, Issue 2.
 "Primal Paradox." About Place Journal. May 2015. Vol. III, Issue III.
 "An Artist’s Journey: Interview with Painter David Bowerman." Connecticut Review. Fall 2009.
 "Aristotle’s Unintended Consequences: Satellite View of Story Reveals 2,300 Year-Old Assumptions." Connecticut Review. Fall 2008. Vol. XXX, No. 2.
 "Tim O’Brien’s Ironic Aesthetic: Faith and the Nature of a ‘True’ Story." With Edward A. Hagan. The Recorder. Spring 2003. Vol. 16, No. 1.
 "Conversation with John Briggs." River Oak Review. Spring 2000. No. 14.
 "Nuance and Omnivalence in the Creative Mind." Advanced Development, A Journal of Adult Giftedness. Spring 1997.
 "Exploring the Potentials of Creative Dialogue," ICIS Forum, Spring 1994.
 "Dialogue between John Briggs and Morris Berman on the Possibility of Social Creativity and Its Attendant Dangers in a Mass Society." Troisième Millénaire. Paris, Mar. 1994.
 "Unholy Desires, Inordinate Affections, a Psychodynamic Inquiry into John Wesley's Relationship with Women." With John P. Briggs, M.D. Connecticut Review. Spring, 1991.
 "Sweden’s Clean Energy Boondoggle." With Lionel Bascom. Sweden, Scoop, Jan. 1, 1991.
 "Quantum Leap." An interview with David Bohm on the physics of social change. New Age Journal. Sept./Oct. 1989.  Excerpted for Wellness for Helping Professionals, Kendall Hunt, 1990 and Utne Reader, Spring 1991. Reprinted as a chapter in Discovering Common Ground, Strategic Futures Conferences for Improving Whole Systems, Marvin R. Weisbord, ed. Jossey-Bass, 1992.
 "Interview with Reese Jenkins," Thomas A. Edison scholar and Director of The Edison Papers. Omni Magazine, April 1989.
 "Beyond Stereotypes." On prodigy and talent. The World and I, Mar. 1987.
 "Interview with David Bohm." Omni Magazine. Jan. 1987.
 "Masks." Transpersonal states induced by masking and metaphor. Science Digest, Nov. 1987. Reprinted in the Grolier Scientific Annual, 1987.
 "The Genius Mind." Science Digest. Dec. 1984. Reprinted in Royal Scientific Society and Squiblines, 1987.
 "Unshrouding the Muse: The Anatomy of Inspiration." Artnews, April 1980.
 "Creativity." Cover article in Northeast, Oct. 7, 1979.
 "Some Thoughts on Consciousness, Language and Metaphor." The Academy, May 1974.

References

External links
 John Briggs' university websiteJohn Briggs' official website

Living people
Wesleyan University alumni
American non-fiction writers
American academics of English literature
Western Connecticut State University faculty
New York University alumni
Union Institute & University alumni
1945 births
Endicott College faculty
People from Granville, Massachusetts
Brooklyn College faculty